"Tie Me Kangaroo Down, Sport" is a song written by Australian singer Rolf Harris in 1957 which became a hit around the world in the 1960s in two recordings (1960 in Australia, New Zealand and the United Kingdom for the original, and 1963 in the United States with a re-recording of the song). Inspired by Harry Belafonte's calypsos, most noticeably "The Jack-Ass Song", it is about an Australian stockman on his deathbed.

Harris originally offered four unknown Australian backing musicians 10% of the royalties for the song in 1960, but they decided to take a recording fee of £28 among them because they thought the song would be a flop. The distinctive sound of Harris's original recording was achieved by the use of an instrument of his own design called the "wobble board"—a two-by-three-foot piece of hardboard.

The recording peaked at No. 1 in the Australian charts and was a top 10 hit in the UK in 1960. In 1963, Harris re-recorded the song in the UK with George Martin as producer, and this remake of the song reached No. 3 on the US Billboard Hot 100 chart and spent three weeks atop the Easy Listening chart in 1963. "Tie Me Kangaroo Down, Sport" was a surprise hit on the US R&B chart where it went to No. 19. The song reached No. 20 on the Canadian CHUM Chart. Harris re-recorded his song a second time along with the Wiggles in 2000 with the introductory verse and the verse mentioning the stockman's death omitted. It is still popular today as a children's song.

The song was used by the WWF in the late 1980s as the theme song of enhancement talent wrestler Outback Jack. Other versions were recorded by Connie Francis (for her 1966 album Connie Francis and The Kids Next Door) and by Pat Boone. A version by the Brothers Four can be found on their CD The Brothers Four, Greatest Hits.

The story of the song
The opening recitation by Harris:
There's an old Australian stockman, lying, dying,
and he gets himself up on one elbow,
and he turns to his mates,
who are gathered 'round him and he says...

is similar to the first verse of a song, The Dying Stockman, collected in Australia by Banjo Paterson and published in 1905:

A strapping young stockman lay dying,
His saddle supporting his head;
His two mates around him were crying,
As he rose on his pillow and said...

In Harris's version, a dying Australian stockman instructs his friends to take care of his affairs after he is gone. The first of these is to watch his wallabies feed, then to tie his kangaroo down, since they jump around (which is the chorus). "Sport" is an Australian term of address, alluding to "good sport", which often, as in this case, praises someone for carrying out a small favour one is asking of them. The lyrics mention animals and objects associated with Australia, including cockatoos, koalas, platypuses, and didgeridoos. His last dying wish is "Tan me hide when I'm dead, Fred". By the end of the song, the stockman has died and his wish has been carried out: "So we tanned his hide when he died, Clyde, and that's it hanging on the shed".

Deleted verse

The fourth verse caused some controversy in 1964 because of its use of the word "Abo", an offensive slang term for Aboriginal Australians. The lyrics of this verse (not found on Rolf Harris's official website) were as follows:

Let me Abos go loose, Lou
Let me Abos go loose:
They're of no further use, Lou
So let me Abos go loose.

The stockman thus emancipates his indigenous offsiders at his death because they are "of no further use" to him. This verse does not feature in 21st-century versions of the song and, in a 2006 interview, Harris expressed regret about the racist nature of the original lyrics.

Performances by Harris
Many parodies, variations, and versions tailored for different countries exist of the song, and Harris performs excerpts from some of them on a 1969 live album released only in the UK called Rolf Harris Live at the Talk of the Town (EMI Columbia SCX 6313). He recorded a version with The Beatles on 18 December 1963 for the BBC programme From Us To You Say The Beatles in which each Beatle is included in the lyrics: "Don't ill-treat me pet dingo, Ringo"; "George's guitar's on the blink, I think"; "Prop me up by the wall Paul"; "Keep the hits coming on, John".  In the final verse, the stockman's tanned hide is used to replace Ringo's drumheads. It was broadcast on 26 December.

Harris performed the song during the Opening Ceremony of the 1982 Commonwealth Games in Brisbane, Queensland, Australia, with a special verse of lyrics written for the event; they are as follows:

Can I welcome you to the Games, friends,
Welcome you to the Games,
Look, I don't know all your names, friends,
But let me welcome you all to the Games.

Covers
The song has been covered by numerous artists over the years
 Pat Boone, on the album "Tie Me Kangaroo Down Sport"
 Slim Dusty, on the album "Aussie Sing Song"
 Ray Conniff, on the album "Somewhere My Love"
 The Brothers Four, on the album "The Big Folk Hits"

See also
List of number-one singles in Australia during the 1960s
List of number-one adult contemporary singles of 1963 (U.S.)

References

External Links
 

1957 songs
1960 debut singles
1963 singles
Rolf Harris songs
Songs written by Rolf Harris
Australian children's songs
Novelty songs
Race-related controversies in music
Satirical songs
Songs about mammals
Songs about Australia
Songs about death
Australian country music songs
Culture of Western Australia
Columbia Graphophone Company singles
Epic Records singles
The Beatles bootleg recordings